The Path of Visionaries (German: Pfad der Visionäre) is a city art project under construction in Berlin, Germany. Located on the southern end of Friedrichstraße in Kreuzberg plaques are embedded in the sidewalks.

History

On May 7, 2006, political representatives of the EU Member States inaugurated the Path of Visionaries in the pedestrian zone of the Berlin- Friedrichstrasse. Floor plaques designated to every single EU Member State are to be installed in a pedestrian zone.

See also
UNESCO
Berlin
Art

References

External links 

Official Website
Inauguration Festival
KUNSTWELT BERLIN 
Official contact

Culture in Berlin
Friedrichshain-Kreuzberg